Remote Radar Head Staxton Wold or RRH Staxton Wold is an air defence radar station operated by the Royal Air Force, located near Scarborough in North Yorkshire, England. As it has been a radar site continuously since 1939, it has a claim to be the oldest working radar station in the world.

History
The present-day site of RRH Staxton Wold has had an early warning function since the 3rd century AD, when it was the site of a warning beacon. Building work did not begin until December 1938 as delays in procuring the site occurred when the landowners resisted selling (this being before the Second World War, so the government found it harder to demand the land by force for the war effort).

The site became fully operational in April 1939 and is the only one of the original stations still in use, and may thus claim to be the oldest continuously serving radar station. Just before the outbreak of war (July 1939), the base was equipped with a Bofors anti-aircraft gun, and by December 1939, it was only one of two operational radar stations in Yorkshire (the other being Danby Beacon). For six weeks during late 1939, Sir Bernard Lovell was posted to Staxton Wold from the University of Manchester whilst assessing radar at the site.

Maintenance and operating staff were drawn from No. 73 Wing RAF, part of No. 60 Group RAF, with administrative and other human necessities catered for by RAF Church Fenton. In the 1990s, the station was maintained and operated by No. 129 Signals Unit, and was part of Sector 2 headquartered by RAF Neatishead, which covered the southern half of the United Kingdom.

In the 1950s, with the threat of aerial bombardment on the station, the RAF installed service fire-fighters at the base, who would tackle fires until North Yorkshire Fire and Rescue Service (NYF&RS) would arrive to assist. In the 1980s, the RAF fire-fighters were asked to attend local incidents in their area until the NYF&RS arrived to take control. However, by the early 21st century, the base was largely automated and the fire-fighters were removed from Staxton Wold.

Today it is a Remote Radar Head (RRH) within the United Kingdom Air Surveillance and Control System (UKASACS). The radar at Staxton Wold is a Lockheed Martin AN/TPS-77 radar which was due to be working by September 2013, but only became fully operational in early 2015. In September 2017, it was reported that the TPS-77 at Staxton Wold would be transferred to RRH Saxa Vord.

As part of a major upgrade of RRH sites around the U.K. the MOD began a programme titled HYDRA in 2020 to install new state-of-the-art communications buildings, radar towers and bespoke perimeter security.

Notable personnel
Bernard Lovell (1939)
Eric Eastwood (1942)

See also
Improved United Kingdom Air Defence Ground Environment – UK air defence radar system in the UK between the 1990s and 2000s
Linesman/Mediator – UK air defence radar system in the UK between the 1960s and 1984
List of Royal Air Force stations
NATO Integrated Air Defense System

References

Sources

External links

Staxton Wold on SubBrit

Radar stations
Staxton Wold
Ryedale